The second Ro-55 was an Imperial Japanese Navy Kaichū type submarine of the K6 sub-class. Completed and commissioned in September 1944, she served in World War II and was sunk during her first war patrol in February 1945.

Design and description
The submarines of the K6 sub-class were versions of the preceding K5 sub-class with greater range and diving depth. They displaced  surfaced and  submerged.

For surface running, the boats were powered by two  diesel engines, each driving one propeller shaft. When submerged each propeller was driven by a  electric motor. They could reach  on the surface and  underwater.

The boats were armed with four internal bow  torpedo tubes and carried a total of ten torpedoes. They were also armed with a single  L/40 anti-aircraft gun and two single  AA guns.

Construction and commissioning

Ro-55 was laid down as Submarine No. 396 on 5 August 1943 by Mitsui Zosensho at Tamano, Japan. She was launched on 23 April 1944 and was renamed Ro-55 that day, the second Japanese submarine of that name. She was completed and commissioned on 30 September 1944.

Service history
Upon commissioning, Ro-55 was attached to the Maizuru Naval District and assigned to Submarine Squadron 11 for workups. She was reassigned to Submarine Division 34 in the 6th Fleet on 4 January 1945.

First war patrol

On 27 January 1945, Ro-55 departed Kure, Japan, to begin her first war patrol, assigned a patrol area in the South China Sea west of Mindoro in the Philippine Islands. While in the Philippine Sea east of Luzon on 2 February 1945, she reported that Allied aircraft had attacked her and that she would reach her patrol area five days late. The Japanese never heard from her again.

Loss
After dark on 7 February 1945, the United States Navy destroyer escort  detected a surfaced submarine on radar while escorting a Leyte Gulf-bound Allied convoy off Iba, Luzon.

The submarine Thomason sank probably was Ro-55. On 1 March 1945, the Imperial Japanese Navy declared her to be presumed lost off the Philippine Islands with all 80 men on board. The Japanese struck her from the Navy list on 10 May 1945.

Notes

References
 

 

Ro-35-class submarines
Kaichū type submarines
Ships built by Mitsui Engineering and Shipbuilding
1944 ships
World War II submarines of Japan
Japanese submarines lost during World War II
World War II shipwrecks in the South China Sea
Maritime incidents in February 1945
Ships lost with all hands
Submarines sunk by United States warships